Patrick Bevin (born 15 February 1991) is a New Zealand professional road racing cyclist, who currently rides for UCI WorldTeam .

Personal life
Bevin grew up in Taupō. He moved to Cambridge in 2014 when the Avantidrome opened to train with the High Performance team of BikeNZ.

His sister Kate is an elite martial artist.

Career
In 2009, Bevin rode for the New Zealand Bici Vida team. During this time, he won two stage victories in the 2009 Tour of Southland and victory in the Oceania Cycling Championships road race. He was the Bike New Zealand Junior Road Cyclist of the Year. Bevin rode for Bissell until the team ended at the end of the 2013 season. During this time, he won several criterium races and victory in the 2012 Bucks County Classic. In 2014, he also rode for the New Zealand national team at the 2014 An Post Rás, where he won two stages and the points competition and briefly led the general classification.

In 2015, now riding for Avanti, Bevin came third in the New Zealand National Time Trial Championships and sixth in the New Zealand National Road Race Championships. After finishing 13th in the Cadel Evans Great Ocean Road Race, he rode in the 2015 Herald Sun Tour. In this race, he finished in the top 10 in three stages, including victory on the final stage (his first professional-level win) at Arthurs Seat. He came second overall in the race, 11 seconds behind Cameron Meyer. His next race was The REV Classic in New Zealand, Bevin's home race and newly promoted to 1.2 status; Bevin won the race in a three-man sprint.

Bevin then travelled to Taiwan to compete in the 2.1-ranked 2015 Tour de Taiwan. In the second stage, he won the hill-top finish ahead of Hossein Askari and took the race lead. After losing the lead to Samad Pourseyedi the following day, Bevin finished fourth overall and won the points classification, having finished in the top ten in four of the five stages. His next professional race was the Tour de Korea. Bevin finished first on stage 4 (beating Caleb Ewan in the sprint) and second on five others. He also finished second in both the general and the points classifications.

He was named in the startlist for the 2016 Vuelta a España. In June 2017, he was named in the startlist for the 2017 Tour de France.

In August 2020, it was announced that Bevin was to join  from the 2021 season, on a two-year contract.

Major results

2009
 1st  Road race, Oceania Junior Road Championships
 Tour of Southland
1st Stages 4 & 7
2010
 1st The REV Classic
 4th Overall Tour de Vineyards
1st Stages 1 & 2
2011
 1st  Overall Tour de Vineyards
1st Stage 1
 2nd Overall Tour of Southland
1st Stage 8
2012
 1st Bucks County Classic
 2nd Overall Redlands Bicycle Classic
1st Stages 1, 2 & 3
 3rd Road race, National Road Championships
 4th Overall New Zealand Cycle Classic
2014
 1st  Overall Tour of Tasmania
 1st The REV Classic
 An Post Rás
1st  Points classification
1st Stages 2 & 4
2015
 1st The REV Classic
 2nd Overall Herald Sun Tour
1st Stage 4
 2nd Overall Tour de Korea
1st Stage 4
 3rd Time trial, National Road Championships
 4th Time trial, Oceania Road Championships
 4th Overall Tour de Taiwan
1st  Points classification
1st Stage 2
2016
 1st  Time trial, National Road Championships
 5th Overall Czech Cycling Tour
1st Stage 1 (TTT)
 10th Overall Tour Down Under
 10th Overall Tour du Haut Var
2017
 6th Overall Tour of Norway
2018
 1st Stage 3 (TTT) Tour de France
 1st Stage 1 (TTT) Tirreno–Adriatico
 UCI Road World Championships
3rd  Team time trial
8th Time trial
 4th Overall Tour of Britain
1st  Points classification
 9th Overall Tour de Yorkshire
2019
 National Road Championships
1st  Time trial
5th Road race
 Tour Down Under
1st  Sprints classification
1st Stage 2
 4th Time trial, UCI Road World Championships
2021
 10th Time trial, Olympic Games
2022
 1st  Overall Tour of Turkey
1st Stage 7
 1st Stage 3 Tour de Romandie

Grand Tour general classification results timeline

References

External links

1991 births
Living people
New Zealand male cyclists
Place of birth missing (living people)
Sportspeople from Taupō
Cyclists at the 2014 Commonwealth Games
Commonwealth Games competitors for New Zealand
Olympic cyclists of New Zealand
Cyclists at the 2020 Summer Olympics
20th-century New Zealand people
21st-century New Zealand people